Naysmith is an occupational surname for a cutler. Notable people with the surname include:

Doug Naysmith (born 1941), British Labour Co-operative politician, Member of Parliament, for Bristol North West (1997–2010)
Gary Naysmith (born 1978), Scottish footballer
Ryan Naysmith, character played by British actor Ricky Whittle in the Sky One football drama Dream Team
Stuart Naysmith, fictional footballer played by Terence Meynard on Sky One's television drama Dream Team

See also

 Naismith (disambiguation)

Occupational surnames
English-language occupational surnames